Philippe Reypens (born 2 October 1969) in Brussels, is a Belgian producer and director.

Biography 

Philippe Reypens was educated at Université libre de Bruxelles (ULB), where he studied journalism and screenwriting.

A former choir boy and music lover, his first films were about vocal music. In 1998, backed by a handful of TV channels such as Arte he directed L'or des anges, a docu-fiction on boy choral tradition in Western Europe. A number of famous vocal groups were featured, such as the Vienna Boys' Choir, the Knabenchor Hannover or The Little Singers of Paris (aka manécanterie des petits chanteurs à la croix de bois). The film met with success on TV channels and was sold in eight countries, e.g. Canada, U.S.A. and Japan.

Philippe Reypens took this reflection on the human voice further with Un peu de fièvre, a short film on a former sopranoi soloist growing into a cellist after his voice break. It was awarded the Best Short Movie Award by Radio Télévision Belge de la Communauté Française (RTBF)

In 2004, he engaged in a polemic discussion against the director and producer of the movie The Chorus, about the inspiration of the project and of given scenes, this following the publishing of a compilation of his own works (Le monde des choristes), which were preparatory works for a feature film.

In 2006, again backed by Arte, he produced and directed Le songe (The Dream), a medium-length fiction which investigates themes such as photography and artistic creation.

In 2012, he directed Eliot, the last part of a trilogy, this time on the spark of a movie maker's vocation. It was partially financed through a campaign of crowdfunding. It was broadcast on many french-speaking TV channels such as BeTV, TV5 Monde and RTBF.

Filmography (director and producer) 
 1989 : Hommage à la photographie (Short film)
 1997 : Le Duo des chats (short film) featured on the DVD "L'or des anges"
 1998 : L'Or des anges ( Docufiction )
 2002 : Rejoice (documentary film)
 2003 : Un peu de fièvre (short film)
 2006 : Le Songe (short film)
 2013 : Eliot (medium length film)

References

External links 
 
 Notice sur le site du British Film Institute
 Site officiel

Catégorie:Belgian director
Catégorie:Belgian producer
Catégorie:Born october 1969
Catégorie:Born in Brussels
Catégorie:Graduated from université libre de Bruxelles

1969 births
Living people